Sanatorium is a thrash metal band from Skopje, North Macedonia. It consists of Pero Stefanovski (guitar and vocals), Konstantin Kačev (guitar), Goran Stanković (bass guitar) and Goran Atanasov (drums).

Biography
After its formation in 1987, the band quickly attracted the attention of media nationwide, and obtained all the music awards in Macedonia soon after. Following this, they were invited to take part in the Hard Metal festival, the biggest heavy metal festival in the former Yugoslavia at the time. The band performed in Novi Sad in 1991 and Belgrade, Serbia in 1992 where they received several offers for releasing their debut album. The plan was postponed due to the disintegration of the Yugoslav federation and the Yugoslav wars that followed.

In 1992, Sanatorium finally released their first official album, Na rabot na razumot (The Edge Of Sanity), for the National Macedonian Radio Television music production. It was recorded and mixed in the M-2 studio in Skopje from April to November 1992. All of the songs are in Macedonian language.

An international tour followed, from which the band released its live album Live in Hungary, recorded in Szeged, Hungary in December 1992.

In 1996, Sanatorium released its third album, No More, recorded in the City Sound Studio in Skopje from November 1995 to April 1996. The record is completely in English, except for the bonus tracks, which are in Macedonian. Promotional tours around Europe followed, mostly around the Balkans.

The band played a concert together with Motörhead in Sofia, Bulgaria in August 2000. The tour ended in Skopje, with a performance at the festival Taksirat in front of 8,000 fans.

In 2001, Sanatorium signed with the Lithium Records label from Skopje. On June 16 of the same year, the band promoted its new self-titled CD Sanatorium, which contained all of the material from the first album, two new singles, and  three live songs. To promote the new album, the band played in several cities in Macedonia; it also performed in big shows with Slayer and Halford in Sofia, Bulgaria, and with Soulfly in Belgrade, Serbia.

See also
Music of North Macedonia
Superhiks

References

External links

Musical groups established in 1987
Macedonian rock music groups
Macedonian heavy metal musical groups
Yugoslav heavy metal musical groups
Musical quartets